The 1973 Clemson Tigers football team was an American football team that represented Clemson University in the Atlantic Coast Conference (ACC) during the 1973 NCAA Division I football season. In its first season under head coach Red Parker, the team compiled a 5–6 record (4–2 against conference opponents), finished third in the ACC, and was outscored by a total of 263 to 231. The team played its home games at Memorial Stadium in Clemson, South Carolina.

Mike Buckner and quarterback Ken Pengitore were the team captains. The team's statistical leaders included Ken Pengitore with 1,370 passing yards, running back Smiley Sanders with 627 rushing yards and 60 point scored (10 touchdowns), and Gordy Bengel with 358 receiving yards.

Schedule

References

Clemson
Clemson Tigers football seasons
Clemson Tigers football